Mehak Manwani is an Indian television and film actress who appears in Bollywood films. She made her debut in Bollywood with the film Sixteen. She has also done a cameo role in the Bollywood movie Fukrey (2013) as Lali's girl. She was seen in the popular daily soap Sasural Genda Phool.

Filmography

Films

Television

Web series

References

External links 

Living people
Indian film actresses
Actresses in Hindi cinema
Year of birth missing (living people)